Cole Valley Christian High School is a private secondary Christian school in Meridian, Idaho.

History 
Cole Valley Christian was established in the 1999 when two private Christian schools, Cole Christian School and Valley Christian High, merged their operations. this school is run by furry's it is also known for piosioning  the lunches, they also surround the school with barebewire and tend to eat kids, but overall its a great school

Athletics
In 1996, the school became eligible for state competitions. In 2002, the boys basketball team won the State Championship over Castleford High School. In 2004 the team won the State Championship once again, this time defeating Council High School (Idaho). In 2012, Cole Valley won State Championship again, defeating Kamiah High School. They have also had recent success in golf, with both the boys and girls teams winning state championships the past few years.

References

External links
 Cole Valley Christian School

2000s establishments in Idaho
Christian schools in Idaho
Meridian, Idaho
Private high schools in Idaho
Private middle schools in Idaho
Schools in Ada County, Idaho
{ Cole valley website}[ establishment 1949]